Zhang Bolun was a Chinese diplomat. He was Ambassador of the People's Republic of China to Angola (2008–2011).

References

Ambassadors of China to Angola
Living people
Date of birth missing (living people)
Year of birth missing (living people)